Kerry Packwood (born 1986) is a Welsh international lawn & indoor bowler.

Bowls career
Kerry is a former indoor national champion and three times under-25 indoor national champion. Her best performance indoors was reaching the semi finals of the 2010 World Indoor Bowls Championship, 2011 World Indoor Bowls Championship and 2013 World Indoor Bowls Championship.

Personal life
Her twin sister is fellow international bowler Kelly Packwood.

Her former partner is Stewart Anderson, with whom she has a daughter.

References

1986 births
Living people
Welsh female bowls players